Globoplay is a Brazilian subscription video on demand service owned by Grupo Globo. The service offers original shows, content newly aired on Grupo Globo's broadcast properties, and content from Rede Globo's library, along with live streams of the local Rede Globo affiliate's main channel, where available.

Original programming

Drama

Comedy

Docu-series

Variety and talk shows

Continuations
These shows have been picked up by Globoplay for additional seasons after having aired previous seasons on another network.

Original films and specials

Documentaries

Music

Specials

References

Globoplay